The Bishop-Andrews Hotel  is a U.S. historic building in Greenville, Florida. It is located at 109 Redding Street, on U.S. 90. On June 28, 1990, it was added to the U.S. National Register of Historic Places. The building has been converted into the Grace Manor Inn, a bed and breakfast house.

It was built in 1902 as a Queen Anne-style hotel, one block from Greenville's railway station.  It is a square three-story building. Its Queen Anne features include its wraparound porch with one segment having a conical roof.

References

External links
 Grace Manor Bed and Breakfast Inn

Buildings and structures in Madison County, Florida
Hotel buildings on the National Register of Historic Places in Florida
Bed and breakfasts in Florida
National Register of Historic Places in Madison County, Florida
1902 establishments in Florida
Hotel buildings completed in 1902